Ananda Chandra Training College is established in 1958 at Jalpaiguri, West Bengal, India. It is accredited from NCTE and it is affiliated to  West Bengal University of Teachers' Training, Education Planning & Administration. It also has an emphasis on extracurricular activities in a variety of fields and it has been approved by the NCTE from 1996.

See also
List of institutions of higher education in West Bengal
Education in India
Education in West Bengal

References

External links
Ananda Chandra Training College
University of North Bengal
University Grants Commission
National Assessment and Accreditation Council

1958 establishments in West Bengal
Colleges in India